Fako is the highest point in Cameroon.

Fako or FAKO may also refer to:

Fako (department), a department in the Southwest Region of Cameroon
FAKO score

See also

Fake (disambiguation)